The county of Dagmar is a cadastral division of Queensland north-west of Cairns. It contains the town of Julatten.

On 7 March 1901, the Governor issued a proclamation legally dividing Queensland into counties under the Land Act 1897. Its schedule described Dagmar thus:

Parishes
Dagmar is subdivided into parishes, listed as follows:

References

Dagmar